The Middleborough Waterworks are historic waterworks on E. Grove St. at Nesmasket River and Wareham St. at Barden Hill Road in Middleborough, Massachusetts.  The 1885 masonry pumphouse is one of the earliest public water works buildings in southeastern Massachusetts.  It, and the well from which it pumps water, were built by the local fire district.  The building has Queen Anne styling;  the well itself is covered by an octagonal roof with cupola.

The waterworks were added to the National Register of Historic Places in 1990.

See also
National Register of Historic Places listings in Plymouth County, Massachusetts

References

Middleborough, Massachusetts
Buildings and structures in Plymouth County, Massachusetts
History of Plymouth County, Massachusetts
National Register of Historic Places in Plymouth County, Massachusetts
Industrial buildings and structures on the National Register of Historic Places in Massachusetts
Historic districts in Plymouth County, Massachusetts
Historic districts on the National Register of Historic Places in Massachusetts